Narayan Narayan — Chulbule Narad Ki Natkhat Leelaye is a mythological comedy television series that airs on BIG Magic, an Indian television station. It is centered on the humorous pursuits of the sage Narada.

Plot summary

The central theme of the show is the intermingling of established mythological characters with contemporary comedy. With the sage Narad and Lord Vishnu as the central characters, the plot revolves around their mentor-devotee relationship with light-hearted humor, mythological devotion as well as moral teachings that are summarized at the end of every episode. The Hindu Trinity (Trimurti) consisting of Brahma, Vishnu and Shiva along with their consorts (Goddesses Lakshmi, Saraswati and Parvati), is represented here in addition to a host of other mythological characters, primarily classified as Devas, like Indra, Agni Dev, Narad is portrayed as the prime devotee of Lord Vishnu, and his mischievous exploits across the celestial and earthly realms, along with his best friend Chingu, are showcased here.

Cast

 Mantra  as Narada (Lord Brahma's Son and Devotee of Lord Vishnu
 Kirti Adarkar  as  Narad's mother
 Ujjwal Rana  as  Lord Vishnu
 Raja Kapse  as  Lord Brahma
 Vaibhav Saraswat  as  Lord Shiva
 Surya Sev Malik  as  Agni Dev
 Deepali Saini  as  Lakshmi
 Jiya Chauhan  as  Parvati
 Shivkant Lakhanpal  as  Indra Dev
 Praveen Srivastava  as  Varun Dev
 Avinash Verma  as  Samudra Dev
 Ram Awana as Shani Dev 
 Poorti Arya'' as Vrinda

References

Indian comedy television series
Indian television series about Hindu deities
Big Magic original programming
2015 Indian television series debuts